is a Japanese ceramist. He was named a Living National Treasure in 1994.

He comes from Toki, Gifu.

References

External links 
 https://web.archive.org/web/20170205013817/http://exhibition.ceramics.ntpc.gov.tw/celadon/en/a_products_03.html 
 http://yakimono-gallery.art.coocan.jp/2011_koten/2011_suzuki_osamu_matsuzakaya.htm
 http://www.nihonkogeikai.or.jp/work/3201

1934 births
Japanese ceramists
Living National Treasures of Japan
Artists from Gifu Prefecture
Living people
Date of birth missing (living people)
20th-century Japanese people
21st-century Japanese people